William Alvin Nicolai (May 15, 1890 - November 25, 1958) was the seventh head football coach at Temple University, a position he held for three seasons, from 1914 until 1916. His overall coaching record at Temple was 9–5–3.
  In his final season at Temple, his team played six games and allowed only 14 points in the entire season.

Nicolai also served as a professor at Temple.

Head coaching record

Football

References

1890 births
1958 deaths
Basketball coaches from New Jersey
Temple Owls football coaches
Temple Owls men's basketball coaches
Temple University faculty
Sportspeople from Union City, New Jersey